Lawrence Furniss (1862–1941) was an English football player, manager and chairman who was the first ever manager of Manchester City.

Footnotes

References
James, Gary - Farewell to Maine Road 

1862 births
1941 deaths
English footballers
Manchester City F.C. managers
Manchester City F.C. players
Manchester City F.C. directors and chairmen
English football managers
English football chairmen and investors
Association footballers not categorized by position